The New American Bible (NAB) is an English translation of the Bible first published in 1970. The 1986 Revised NAB is the basis of the revised Lectionary, and it is the only translation approved for use at Mass in the Latin Church Catholic dioceses of the United States and the Philippines, and the 1970 first edition is also an approved Bible translation by the Episcopal Church in the United States.

Stemming originally from the Confraternity Bible, a translation of the Vulgate by the Confraternity of Christian Doctrine, the project transitioned to translating the original biblical languages in response to Pope Pius XII's 1943 encyclical Divino afflante Spiritu. The translation sponsored by the U.S. bishops' committee on the Confraternity of Christian Doctrine and was carried out in stages by members of the Catholic Biblical Association of America (CBA) "from the Original Languages with Critical Use of All the Ancient Sources" (as the title pages state). These efforts eventually became the New American Bible under the liturgical principles and reforms of the Second Vatican Council (1962–1965).

First edition: NAB 
The first edition of the New American Bible was published on September 30, 1970. Prior to its full publication, several portions of the New American Bible were released; for example, a translation of the Book of Genesis was published in 1952. It was compiled by 51 scholars from 1944 to 1970, overseen by an editorial board headed by Father Stephen J. Hartdegen. It was translated from Hebrew, Greek, and Aramaic, rather than from the Latin Vulgate, as previous Catholic translations of the Bible into English had been; it also incorporated then-newly discovered documents such as the Dead Sea Scrolls and the Masada manuscript.

Second edition: RNAB 
A revised edition of the New Testament translation of the New American Bible was published in 1986.

Third edition: RNAB 
A revised version of the Psalms was published in 1991.

Fourth edition: NABRE 

In 1994, work began on a revision of the Old Testament.

In September 2008, the Ad Hoc Committee accepted the final book of the Old Testament, namely, Jeremiah. In November of that year, the United States Conference of Catholic Bishops approved the complete Old Testament, including footnotes and introductions, but it would not permit it to be published with the Book of Psalms of 1991. It accepted the revised Grail Psalter instead, which the Holy See approved and which replaced the revised NAB Psalter for lectionaries for Mass in the United States. The Psalms were again revised in 2008 and sent to the Bishops Committee on Divine Worship but also rejected in favor of the revised Grail Psalter. A final revision of the NAB Psalter was undertaken using suggestions that the Ad Hoc Committee vetted and to more strictly conform to Liturgiam Authenticam.

In January 2011, it was announced that the fourth edition of the NAB would be published on March 9 of that year.

Future editions of the NAB 

In 2012, the USCCB "announced a plan to revise the New Testament of the New American Bible Revised Edition so a single version can be used for individual prayer, catechesis and liturgy."

The revision is now underway and, after the necessary approvals from the Bishops and the Holy See, is expected to be completed by 2025.

See also
Catholic Bible
Divino afflante Spiritu
Dei verbum
Liturgiam authenticam
International Commission on English in the Liturgy (ICEL)

References

Bibliography 
 (with imprimatur of Hector Cunial in Latin: Archiepiscopus Soleropolitan, Vicesregens Vicariatu Urbis, Vicesgerens Typis Pontificis Universitatis Gregorianae, as it is also attested in

External links 
 The New American Bible - online access (official Vatican website)
 The New American Bible, Revised Edition - online access (official USCCB website)

1970 books
Bible translations into English
1970 in Christianity
Catholic theology and doctrine
Catholic bibles